The Service technique de l'aéronautique (STAé) was a French state body responsible for coordinating technical aspects of aviation in France. Formed in 1916 as the Section technique de l'aéronautique the STAé continued until 1980 when its functions were distributed among other French governmental bodies, including the Service technique des programmes aéronautiques (STPA), Service technique des télécommunications et des équipements aéronautiques (STPA) and the Service central de la production, des prix et de la maintenance (SCPM).

History
In 1877 l'Établissement central de l'aérostation militaire de Chalais-Meudon (Central Establishment of the air balloon of Chalais- Meudon) was formed as the first aeronautical laboratory in the world, with a mission to design and assemble all French military aero-static equipment, from components made in industry, and train personnel in their use.

At the beginning of 1916 French military aircraft were being surpassed in performance and armament. The lack of technical coordination lead to disagreements between the views and desires of command and the capabilities of manufacturers, resulting in development delays and technological dead ends.

At the instigation of the Deputy Secretary of State for Aeronautics René Besnard and Minister of War General Gallieni, the Section technique de l'aéronautique was created on 21 February 1916, to coordinate all aspects of the design of new aircraft, led by Émile Dorand former head of Laboratoire d'aéronautique de Chalais-Meudon, ( the contemporary French equivalent of the British Royal Aircraft Factory).

The STAé moved to Issy-les-Moulineaux, creating the l’Établissement d’expériences techniques d’Issy-les-Moulineaux (Issy-les-Moulineaux Technical Experiments Establishment), which included laboratories, wind tunnels and ground testing facilities, placed at the disposal of the Ministère de la Guerre (Ministry of War). the new establishment was charged with directing, coordinating and centralising new research and experiments concerning military aviation, in three categories: aviation, armament and R&D (research and development).

Dorand led the STAé in development of a "standard atmosphere" in order to be able to compare the performance of different aircraft and equipment using a common baseline. The STAé was also charged with ensuring that the demands of service chiefs were met, where possible by French industry, correlating the demands of the military with the material possibilities of the moment; determine the performance of equipment presented by manufacturers to improve knowledge of the laws of aeronautics.

The first tasks of the STAé were: to develop a tractor propeller observation aircraft to allow defence against the Fokker E.III attacking from behind; to introduce a fighter able to fire through the propeller disk and develop twin-engined three-seat observation aircraft. Latterly the STAé turned its attention to aircraft engines issuing specifications and pushing for lighter, more powerful and reliable engines. On 6 April 1918, a ministerial decision officially made the STAé responsible for aircraft, engines, armament, flight test and research.

On 6 June 1919, l'Office de coordination générale de l'aéronautique was created and attached to the direction de l'aéronautique militaire, bringing together the STAé, Service des fabrications de l'aéronautique (SFA) and Service de la navigation aérienne (SNAé).

The STAé established regulations for designing aircraft to improve safety, as well as drawing up specifications for a wide range of military aircraft classes, which were assessed in a competitive fashion and production contracts issued accordingly.

In 1934, under the ministère du général Victor Denain, the Direction générale de l’aéronautique was replaced by the Direction des constructions aériennes, in which the STAé and the SPAé were incorporateded .

Until 1939–1940, the STAé standardised equipment and products for civil and military aviation under the specific regulations of the Ministry of Air, developing and approving standards in consultation with industry and their implementation. After the surrender of France in May 1940, the STAé evacuated to Roanne in Vichy France.

In 1945, Inspector General Merle, director of the STAé created an Etudes Special section (STAé/ES) for research and development of missiles; other sections that emerged over the years included Etudes Special sections for helicopters, equipment, engines, armament and more...

STAé specifications

From 1919 the STAé drew up specifications for specific roles in military aviation and assessed designs from industry competitively before production contracts were issued.

Directors
Émile Dorand 28 February 1916 - 11 January 1918
Albert Caquot 12 January 1918 - 1920
Georges Fortrant 1920-1925
Albert Caquot 1928-1933
...
Roger Guénod 1974-1980

References

Further reading
Aeronautics during the World War, Paris, Maurice de Brunoff,1919
The Evolution of French Aircraft During the War, by Colonel Dorand, p. 111-118
Committee for the History of Aeronautics, A half-century of aeronautics in France: introductory work, Department of Armament History, Center for Advanced Studies of Armament,2003
Committee for the History of Aeronautics, A half-century of aeronautics in France: The equipment, vol.  2, Department of Armament History of the Center for Advanced Studies of Armament, 2004
DGAC Historical Archives, Civil Aviation Directorate,2009 [PDF]
Louis Bonte, The History of flight tests, Paris, Editions Larivière, coll.  "  Docavia  " ( n o 3)1975
Patrick Facon, "  The Mechanization of War: The rear, factories and schools  ," The Fana Aviation, n o HS 48,April 2012, p. 100 ( ISSN 0757-4169 )
BNAE - Activity Report 2010, p. 2 [PDF], Bureau of Aeronautics and Space Standards,2010
Marie-Catherine Dubreil-Villatoux, [PDF] Archives of the military aeronautics of the First World War, Historical Service of the Defense, 2008 (accessed 15 February 2015 ) p. 32.
Albert Étévé , Victory rosettes, Robert Laffont, 1970
City of Meudon - From Kite to Aviation: Aviation, http://www.carnetdevol.org 
Marie-Catherine Dubreil-Villatoux, Archives of military aircraft of the First World War, [PDF], Defense Historical Service,2008 (accessed 15 February 2015 ) p. 36
The Legislative Bulletin Dalloz: laws, decrees, orders, circulars, etc. , Paris, Dalloz, 1919, p.p. 428-429
General Directorate of Armament, Tactical missiles from 1945 to 2000
Jean-Marie Potelle, The History of Djinn, Helico-passion
Archives of the Military Aeronautics of the First World War, [PDF], Historical Defense Service,2008 (accessed 15 February 2015 ) p. 44
General Officers, webgenealogies.com (accessed February 13, 2015 )
Georges Bousquet and Gabriel Colin, Roger Guenod (43) A life marked by passion flight test, the Yellow and the Red

Aviation organizations based in France